Loveridge's tree frog (Myersiohyla loveridgei)  is a species of frogs in the family Hylidae endemic to Venezuela. Its natural habitats are subtropical or tropical moist lowland forests and rivers.

Sources

Myersiohyla
Amphibians described in 1961
Taxonomy articles created by Polbot